The 2017–18 Turkish Airlines EuroLeague was the 18th season of the modern era of Euroleague Basketball and the eighth under the title sponsorship of the Turkish Airlines. Including the competition's previous incarnation as the FIBA Europe Champions Cup, this was the 61st season of the premier competition for European men's professional basketball clubs.

The 2018 EuroLeague Final Four was played at the Štark Arena, in Belgrade, Serbia. Real Madrid won its record tenth EuroLeague title, after defeating defending champions Fenerbahçe Doğuş in the championship game.

Team allocation
A total of sixteen teams participate. The labels in the parentheses show how each team qualified for the place of its starting round (TH: EuroLeague title holders). Eleven teams were placed as Licensed Clubs, long-term licenses, while five spots were given to Associated Clubs, based on merit.
LC: Qualified as a licensed club with a long-term licence
1st, 2nd, etc.: League position after Playoffs
EC: EuroCup champion
WC: Wild card

Notes

Teams
A total of 16 teams from 9 countries took part in the league, including 11 sides with a long-term licence from the 2016–17 season, 1 team qualified from the EuroCup and the 4 highest-placed teams from the ABA League, the German Bundesliga, the VTB United League and Spain's ACB.

Brose Bamberg and Crvena zvezda qualified, after winning the Bundesliga and ABA League titles respectively. Galatasaray Odeabank and Darüşşafaka did not appear this season, as Galatasaray did not have any opportunity in the previous season to qualify and Darüşşafaka finished their two-year wild card. UNICS lost its place in the EuroLeague, as Khimki qualified as runner-up of the VTB United League. Unicaja qualified as the EuroCup champions, after beating Valencia Basket in the Finals. However, Valencia also qualified as the Spanish champions.

Venues and locations
Notes

Personnel and sponsorship

Notes
1. Cultura del Esfuerzo is the motto of the club.

Managerial changes

Regular season

In the regular season, teams play against each other home and away in a round-robin format. The top eight teams advance to the playoffs and the bottom eight teams are eliminated. The regular season runs from 12 October 2017 to 6 April 2018.

League table

Results

Playoffs
 Playoffs series are best-of-five.  The first team to win three games wins the series. A 2–2–1 format is used – teams with home-court advantage play games 1, 2, and 5 at home, while their opponents host games 3 and 4. Games 4 and 5 are only played if necessary. The four victorious teams advance to the Final Four.

Series

Final Four

The Final Four, held over a single weekend, is the last phase of the season. The four remaining teams play a single knockout round on Friday evening, with the two winners advancing to the championship game. Sunday starts with the third-place game, followed by the championship game. The Final Four was played at the Štark Arena in Belgrade, Serbia in May 2018.

Attendances
Attendances include playoff games:

Awards

EuroLeague MVP 
 Luka Dončić ( Real Madrid)

EuroLeague Final Four MVP 
 Luka Dončić ( Real Madrid)

All-EuroLeague Teams 

Sources:2017-18 All-EuroLeague Second Team presented by 7DAYS

Alphonso Ford Top Scorer Trophy
  Alexey Shved ( Khimki)

Best Defender
  Kyle Hines ( CSKA Moscow)

Rising Star
  Luka Dončić ( Real Madrid)

Magic Moment
  Jan Veselý ( Fenerbahçe)

MVP of the Round

Regular season

Playoffs

MVP of the Month

Individual statistics

Rating

Points

Rebounds

Assists

Other statistics

See also
2017–18 EuroCup Basketball
2017–18 Basketball Champions League
2017–18 FIBA Europe Cup

References

External links

Official website

EuroLeague seasons